The  Bases  Conversion  and  Development  Authority (BCDA)  is  a government-owned and controlled corporation under the Office of the President of the Philippines.  It is a government instrumentality vested with corporate powers under Republic Act 7227 (Bases Conversion and Development Act of 1992), signed into law by former President Corazon C. Aquino on March 13, 1992.  The BCDA Charter was as amended by RA 7917 in 1995, and further amended by RA 9400 in 2007. The corporation is mandated to transform former US military bases into alternative productive civilian use.

History
The Bases Conversion and Development Authority (BCDA) is a development corporation vested with corporate powers under Republic Act (RA) 7227 (Bases Conversion and Development Act of 1992), signed into law by former President Corazon C. Aquino on March 13, 1992. The BCDA Charter was amended by RA 7917 in 1995, and further amended by RA 9400 in 2007.

Organization and function

BCDA engages in public-private partnerships to push forward public infrastructure such as tollways, airports, seaports, and major real estate developments.   It is one of the key agencies driving "Build Build Build", the Philippine government's infrastructure plan.  This infrastructure plan is intended to reduce congestion, create jobs and alleviate costs in the Philippines.

During the first two years of the present administration under Philippine President Rodrigo Duterte, BCDA has contributed P8.2 billion to the modernization program of the Armed Forces of the Philippines (AFP), BCDA's major stakeholder.  The amount represents 20 percent of the total P40 billion received members of the AFP from BCDA since the state-run agency was created in 1992.   For the past 25 years, BCDA has already disposed a total of Php90.32 billion worth of assets.
Since 1992, BCDA has generated Php57.215 billion in disposition proceeds from the sale, lease and/or joint venture development of former Metro Manila camps and their transformation into new premier mix-use economic districts.  The biggest two are Fort Bonifacio and Villamor Air Base, which are now known as Bonifacio Global City and Newport City, respectively.

The biggest stakeholder of the BCDA is the Armed Forces of the Philippines (AFP). Of the Php57.215 billion generated through BCDA's Asset Disposition Program (ADP), 38.08% or P21.788 billion has been remitted to the National Treasury for the account of the AFP.  This is broken down into Php12.292 billion for the AFP modernization program and Php9.496 billion for military replication expenses. As mandated by R.A.7227 and amended by R.A. 7917, other beneficiaries are the contiguous municipalities of Taguig, Pateros and Makati, and 14 other government beneficiary agencies, receiving shares amounting to Php462 million and Php7.272 billion, respectively. On the other hand, some Php619 million went to the replication of non-military facilities affected by the developments, Php4.373 billion for taxes, duties and fees and Php7.190 to direct expenses like construction of site development projects, relocation and housing of informal occupants, survey, appraisal and titling expenses, as well as administrative costs. Further, Php10.891 billion went to the bases conversion program, the other major mandate under RA7227.

After BCDA remits the money to the Bureau of Treasury, the utilization and distribution of the remittances become the responsibilities of the Department of Budget and Management in accordance with the approved fiscal program of the government and shall release the share of the beneficiary agencies pursuant to the budget execution guidelines.

Properties
The following sites are currently owned and maintained by the BCDA Group:

  Bataan Technology Park in Morong, Bataan (formerly the Philippine Refugee Processing Center) (365 ha)
 New Clark City in Tarlac (9,450 ha)
 Clark Freeport Zone, Pampanga (2,033 ha)
 Camp John Hay Special Economic Zone (625 ha)
 Poro Point Freeport Zone (236 ha)
 Subic Bay Freeport Zone (13,599 ha)
 Bonifacio Global City and Villamor Airbase (900 ha)

Projects
The BCDA is the builder of the Subic-Clark-Tarlac Expressway, a four-lane tollway. It also constructed and manages Clark International Airport.

See also 
 Office of the President of the Philippines
 Icone Tower
 Philippines - United States Visiting Forces Agreement

References

External links 
 BCDA website

Government-owned and controlled corporations of the Philippines
Government agencies under the Office of the President of the Philippines
Government agencies established in 1992
1992 establishments in the Philippines